Baby Shaq may refer to:

Eddy Curry, an American basketball player
Nathan Jawai, an Australian basketball player
Sofoklis Schortsanitis, a Greek basketball player